In June 2014, France played a three-test series against Australia as part of the 2014 mid-year rugby union tests. They played the Wallabies across the three week June International window (2–22 June), and which were part of the third year of the global rugby calendar established by the International Rugby Board, which runs through to 2019. This was France's first tour to Australia since 2009 and first series since 2008.

Fixtures

Squads
Note: Ages, caps and clubs are as per 7 June, the first test match of the tour.

France
On 7 May 2014, coach Philippe Saint-André named a 31-man squad for the three test tour of Australia in June.

On 19 May 2014, Benjamin Kayser was withdrawn from the squad due to injury, and was replaced by Brice Mach.

Coaching team:
 Head coach:  Guy Novès
 Forwards coach:  Yannick Bru
 Backs coach:  Jean-Frederic Dubois

Australia
The 32-man squad for the 3-test series against France, in Brisbane (7 June), Melbourne (14 June) and Sydney (21 June).

Wingers Henry Speight (Brumbies) and Tom English (Rebels), prop Paddy Ryan (Waratahs) and Lock Cadeyrn Neville (Rebels) have also been invited to train with the squad ahead of the test series.

On 1 June, Ben Alexander with withdrawn from the squad due to injury. Paddy Ryan was promoted to the main squad as Alexander's replacement, while Laurie Weeks was added into the training squad to replace Ryan.

On 9 June, James Hanson was added to the squad to replace the injured Stephen Moore who sustained a knee injury in the first test.

Coaching team:
 Head coach:  Ewen McKenzie
 Forwards coach:  Andrew Blades
 Backs coach:  Jim McKay
 Defence coach:  Nick Scrivener

Matches

First test

Notes:
 James Slipper and Wycliff Palu earned their 50th test cap for Australia.
 Sam Carter made his international debut for Australia.
 Felix Le Bourhis and Rémi Lamerat made their international debuts for France.

Second test

Notes:
 James Horwill earned his 50th test cap for Australia.
 Nathan Charles, Luke Jones and Laurie Weeks made their international debuts for Australia.
 Alexandre Menini made his international debut for France.
 Australia reclaim the Trophée des Bicentenaires for the first time since 2010, after losing it in 2012.
 This was the first time France has failed to score any points against Australia, in the 44 meetings between the two teams.
 Fewest points in an Australian win since their 6–3 win over New Zealand in 1958, and first Australian win without a try since their 21–13 win over Wales in 2001.

Third test

Notes:
 Will Skelton made his international debut for Australia.
 The 43,188-person crowd was a record crowd for an Australian test at Allianz Stadium.

Statistics
Key
Con: Conversions
Pen: Penalties
DG: Drop goals
Pts: Points

France statistics

Test series statistics

References

France national rugby union team tours
Rugby union tours of Australia
History of rugby union matches between Australia and France
France rugby union tour of Australia
France rugby union tour of Australia